Prasinoxena astroteles is a species of moth in the family Pyralidae first described by Edward Meyrick in 1938. It was found on Java.

References 

Pyralidae